The 1990 Rhode Island United States Senate election was held on November 6, 1990 to select the U.S. Senator from the state of Rhode Island.  Democratic U.S. Senator Claiborne Pell decided to seek re-election and defeated Republican Representative Claudine Schneider in a landslide.

Candidates

Democrat 
 Claiborne Pell, incumbent U.S. Senator

Republican 
 Claudine Schneider, U.S. Representative

Results

See also 
 1990 United States Senate elections

References 

1990 Rhode Island elections
Rhode Island
1990